Reinout Scholten van Aschat (born 9 November 1989) is a Dutch actor.

Career 

Between 2005 and 2009 he played the role of Roderick Lodewijkx in the television series Gooische Vrouwen. He also played this character in the 2014 film Gooische Vrouwen 2.

In 2012, he won the Golden Calf for Best Actor award for his role in the film The Heineken Kidnapping. He was also nominated for the Golden Calf for Best Actor award in 2016 for his role in the film Beyond Sleep, a film adaptation of the book Nooit meer slapen by Willem Frederik Hermans.

He also played in episodes of the television series Keyzer & De Boer Advocaten and Flikken Maastricht.

Personal life 

He is a son of Gijs Scholten van Aschat and a grandson of Karel Scholten van Aschat.

Awards 

 2012: Golden Calf for Best Actor, The Heineken Kidnapping

Selected filmography 

 2007: Timboektoe
 2011: The Heineken Kidnapping
 2014: Gooische Vrouwen 2
 2015: Cosmos Laundromat
 2016: Beyond Sleep
 2018: Capri-Revolution
 2019: Nocturne
 2020: De Oost
 Upcoming: Pijn
 Upcoming: Alpha.

References

External links 
 

1989 births
Living people
21st-century Dutch male actors
Dutch male actors
Dutch male film actors
Dutch male television actors
Golden Calf winners